Trump International Golf Club, West Palm Beach is a private 27-hole golf course in West Palm Beach, Florida. It was designed by Jim Fazio, who was given a budget of over US$40 million and was opened in 1999. This venue was Trump's first golf course property.

The Championship course measures 7,326 yards, and has a par 72 layout that has hosted championships for the LPGA. In addition, the golf course has a nine-hole course. The clubhouse can host weddings and other social or business events. A three-tiered driving range is available.

The regular initiation fee for membership was reported to be US$150,000 in 2011, and the annual fee US$25,000. The senior director of instruction for Trump Golf Properties, Gary Wiren, is based out of this resort.

See also
 Donald Trump and golf

References

External links
 Official website
 TRUMP NATIONAL GOLF CLUB

1999 establishments in Florida
Sports venues completed in 1999
Assets owned by the Trump Organization
West Palm Beach, Florida
Golf clubs and courses in Florida